Disconnect is a 2018 Kenyan romantic comedy film directed by David 'Tosh' Gitonga and Michael Jones. The film stars Kenyan actress Brenda Wairimu and actor Nick Mutuma who lead a diverse cast which explores the dating scene in Nairobi.

The film will be airing on Netflix on October 16, 2020 making it the latest Kenyan film on the on-demand video platform, after the premieres of Poacher and Sincerely Daisy.

Plot
The film revolves around a secret romantic attraction between two best friends, Celine (played by Brenda Wairimu) and Josh (Nick Mutuma), and their closest friends in the Kenyan capital. Celine has difficulty getting into the right kind of relationship, and often relies on the advice and emotional support of her friends who include TK (Catherine Kamau-Karanja) the crazy one, Judy (Patricia Kihoro) the prayer warrior, Robin (Pierra Makena) Celine's sister and Preeti (Aseem Sharma) her co-worker and the fun one. Celine's best friend is Josh, played by Nick Mutuma, who also has his group of guy friends who help him navigate the urban relationship jungle; consisting of Otis (Pascal Tokodi) and Jennings (Arthur Sanya).

Cast
Brenda Wairimu as Celine
Nick Mutuma as Josh
Catherine Kamau as TK
Pascal Tokodi as Otis
Bridget Shighadi as Neema
Pierra Makena as Robin
Patricia Kihoro as Judy
Justin Mirichii as Khalid
Aseem Sharma as Preeti
Arthur Sanya Muiruri as Jennings (as Arthur Sanya)
Brian Ogola as Richard
Illya Frank as Belinda
Isaya Evans as Kenneth
Jazz Mistri as Ciru
Willy Mwangi as Jacob
Samwel Njihia as Celine's Grandfather
Jerry Mokua as Belinda's Driver
Keith Chuaga as Andrew
Zainabu Harri as Mrs. Njuguna (as Zainabu Hari)
Joyce Maina as Samantha
Joe Miano as Period Date Guy
Muthoni Gatheca as Ma Anzeste
May Wairimu as Celine's Mum
Maqbul Mohammed as Patrick (as Makbul Mohammed)
Stanley Mburu as Gatheca
Hellen Njoki as Betty
Yvonne Wambui as Nurse
Runjugi Ian Andrew as Reporter
Humphrey Maina as Kamotho Junior
Winnie Wangui as Mrs. Mbuthia
Shiviske Shivisi as Ashley
Vera Atsang as Neema's Assistant
Esther Mueni as Waitress

Release
Brenda Wairimu as Celine
Nick Mutuma as Josh
Catherine Kamau as TK
Pascal Tokodi as Otis
Bridget Shighadi as Neema
Pierra Makena as Robin
Patricia Kihoro as Judy
Justin Mirichii as Khalid
Aseem Sharma as Preeti
Arthur Sanya Muiruri as Jennings (as Arthur Sanya)
Brian Ogola as Richard
Illya Frank as Belinda
Isaya Evans as Kenneth
Jazz Mistri as Ciru
Willy Mwangi as Jacob
Samwel Njihia as Celine's Grandfather
Jerry Mokua as Belinda's Driver
Keith Chuaga as Andrew
Zainabu Harri as Mrs. Njuguna (as Zainabu Hari)
Joyce Maina as Samantha
Joe Miano as Period Date Guy
Muthoni Gatheca as Ma Anzeste
May Wairimu as Celine's Mum
Maqbul Mohammed as Patrick (as Makbul Mohammed)
Stanley Mburu as Gatheca
Hellen Njoki as Betty
Yvonne Wambui as Nurse
Runjugi Ian Andrew as Reporter
Humphrey Maina as Kamotho Junior
Winnie Wangui as Mrs. Mbuthia
Shiviske Shivisi as Ashley
Vera Atsang as Neema's Assistant
Esther Mueni as Waitress

References

External links
 

2018 films
Swahili-language films
2018 romantic comedy films
Films set in 2018
Kenyan comedy films